Gamasolaelaps bellingeri is a species of mite belonging to the family Veigaiidae. The female is only 0.5 mm in length, the male even smaller. Both can be recognized by the dorsal sclerotized shield being deeply incised laterally. This species is found in damp habitats such as moss and leaf litter in Jamaica.

References
The genera Cyrthydrolaelaps Berlese and Gamasolaelaps Berlese (Acarina-Mesostigmata) G. Owen Evans, Acarologia, I (1959)

Mesostigmata
Animals described in 1959
Endemic fauna of Jamaica